William Cumberland Cruikshank (1745 in Edinburgh – 27 June 1800) was a British physician and anatomist.  He was the author of The Anatomy of the Absorbing Vessels of the Human Body, which was first published in 1786.

He went to London in 1771 and became assistant to William Hunter in his anatomical work. In 1797, he was the first to demonstrate that a particular crystallizable substance exists in the urine and is precipitated from it by nitric acid.

He was elected a Fellow of the Royal Society in June 1797.

Notes and references

Further reading

1745 births
1800 deaths
Medical doctors from Edinburgh
Scottish chemists
Scottish biologists
Scottish anatomists
Fellows of the Royal Society